Ziphosuchia is a clade of mesoeucrocodylian crocodyliforms that includes notosuchians and sebecosuchians.

Systematics
First constructed in 2000, it was considered to include Notosuchus, Libycosuchus, and Sebecosuchia. In a 2004 phylogenetic study, it was defined as the most recent common ancestor of Notosuchus, Libycosuchus, and Baurusuchoidea and all of its descendants.

Ziphosuchia is often considered to be the sister group of Neosuchia, a clade that includes modern crocodilians. Razanandrongobe is the oldest representative of this clade.

References

Terrestrial crocodylomorphs
Late Cretaceous crocodylomorphs
Paleogene crocodylomorphs
Neogene crocodylomorphs
Miocene extinctions
Late Cretaceous first appearances
Fossil taxa described in 2000